Jhonny Alexander da Silva Sosa (born 21 August 1991) is an Uruguayan footballer who plays in Uruguayan Segunda División for Rampla Juniors as a goalkeeper.

International career
He was part of the Uruguay U-20 squad that participated in the 2011 South American Youth Championship which qualified his country to the Youth World Cup in Colombia, tournament where he was used as second goalkeeper.

References

External links
 
 Jhonny da Silva at BDFA.com.ar 

1991 births
Living people
People from Canelones Department
Uruguayan footballers
Uruguay under-20 international footballers
Uruguayan expatriate footballers
Uruguayan Primera División players
Primera Nacional players
Categoría Primera A players
Tacuarembó F.C. players
Nueva Chicago footballers
El Tanque Sisley players
Atlético Huila footballers
Cúcuta Deportivo footballers
Club Atlético Temperley footballers
Rampla Juniors players
Association football goalkeepers
Uruguayan people of Brazilian descent
Uruguayan expatriate sportspeople in Argentina
Uruguayan expatriate sportspeople in Colombia
Expatriate footballers in Argentina
Expatriate footballers in Colombia